Axel Thue (3 June 1904 – 28 October 1985) was a Norwegian actor. 

He was born in Oslo. He made his stage debut at the trial stage of Det Nye Teater and was employed there in 1933. He worked at Trøndelag Teater from 1936 to 1943 and Nationaltheatret from 1945 to 1974.

References

1904 births
1985 deaths
Norwegian male stage actors
Norwegian male film actors
20th-century Norwegian male actors
Male actors from Oslo